Telesphorus (in Greek Tελεσφόρoς; lived 4th century BC) was a nephew and a general in the service of Antigonus Monophthalmus, the king of Asia, who was sent by him in 312 BC, with a fleet of fifty ships and a considerable army to the Peloponnese, to oppose the forces of Polyperchon and Cassander. At first he was very successful; he drove out Polyperchon’s garrisons from all the cities of the peninsula, except Sicyon and Corinth, which were held by Polyperchon himself; but having joined with Medius in an attempt to relieve Oreus, to which Cassander had laid siege, they were defeated, with the loss of several ships. The following summer (311 BC), Antigonus having conferred the chief direction of the war in the Peloponnese upon his other nephew Ptolemy, Telesphorus was so indignant that he shook off his allegiance, and having induced some of his soldiers to follow him, established himself in Elis on his own account, and even plundered the sacred treasures at Olympia. He was, however, soon after, induced by Ptolemy to submit. Antigonus must have forgiven him because a few years later Telesphorus was on the staff of Demetrius, Antigonus’ son.

References
Smith, William (editor); Dictionary of Greek and Roman Biography and Mythology, "Telesphorus", Boston, (1867)

Notes

 

Generals of Antigonus I Monophthalmus
4th-century BC Greek people